Neighbours is an Australian television soap opera that was first broadcast on 18 March 1985 until its final episode on 28 July 2022. The following is a list of characters that first appeared in the serial in 1991, by order of first appearance. The 7th season of Neighbours began airing on 21 January 1991. All characters were introduced by executive producer Don Battye. Rachel Blakely and Genevieve Lemon made their debuts in August as Gaby Willis and Brenda Riley respectively. Andrew Williams joined the cast as Brenda's nephew, Guy Carpenter in September, as did Simone Robertson as Phoebe Bright. Lorraine Bayly began playing Faye Hudson in November and in the same month Andrew Robinson, son of established characters Paul and Christina Robinson was born.

Gaby Willis

Gaby Willis, played by Rachel Blakely, made her first appearance on 12 August 1991. Blakely was invited to audition for the role by a Neighbours casting director, who spotted her picture on the cover of a magazine. The character was introduced alongside her brother Brad Willis, played by Scott Michaelson. Gaby was initially said to be studying at a business school in Japan. She later becomes a boutique owner. Josephine Monroe, author of Neighbours: The First 10 Years thought that Gaby's "cascading dark hair" and model looks meant there was never a shortage of men after her. An Inside Soap writer stated Gaby and Glen Donnelly (Richard Huggett) had Ramsay Street's biggest on-off romance since Scott (Jason Donovan) and Charlene (Kylie Minogue). Gaby later gives birth to a son Zac (Jay Callahan). Blakely reprised her role for the show's 20th anniversary episode in July 2005.

Brenda Riley

Brenda Riley, played by Genevieve Lemon, made her first appearance on 21 August 1991. Vanessa Keys of The Daily Telegraph described Brenda as "a hard-bitten woman". A writer for BBC Online said Brenda's most notable moment was "Putting Pam in a frenzy"

Brenda is the younger sister of Lou Carpenter (Tom Oliver). When Lou tells her his former flame Madge Bishop (Anne Charleston) and her husband Harold (Ian Smith) are leasing the Coffee Shop while they tour Australia, Brenda heads to Erinsborough and secures an interview. Madge and Brenda get along well, but Harold finds her coarse jokes off-putting. Madge convinces him Brenda is the best person for the job and they also rent out Number 24 Ramsay Street to her. Madge is sure she recognises Brenda from somewhere and she admits she is Lou's sister, which upsets Harold, who previously competed with Lou for Madge's affections. Harold is keen to terminate the agreement, but softens when Brenda is able to get him a $5000 discount on a campervan for the Bishops' trip and agrees to let her stay.

When Brenda looks after Harold's grandchildren Toby (Ben Guerens) and Sky Mangel (Miranda Fryer), Toby lies and tells her that he is allowed to stay up later than normal on weekends, much to Madge's ire. However, when the children are tired out the next day, Brenda explains that she wanted to them teach them a lesson that getting their own way is not always a good thing. Madge apologises to Brenda before she and Harold leave on their trip. Brenda's nephew, Guy Carpenter (Ian Williams) arrives looking for a place to stay and the neighbours are surprised when they see Brenda moving Guy's belongings in, and they think she is dating a younger man. Brenda then explains that Guy is Lou's son and did not want Harold knowing in case he became upset again. When Harold disappears after being swept off of a rock and is presumed dead, Madge goes to visit her family to get over the loss and Brenda takes over the Coffee shop indefinitely. She immediately becomes a popular fixture. However, her gossiping gets her in trouble when she unwittingly tells Felicity Brent (Rona McLeod) about Dorothy Burke's (Maggie Dence) marital problems, which Felicity uses in the local elections to discredit Dorothy, leaving her furious when she loses her seat and a feud develops.

Brenda reciprocates when Doug Willis (Terence Donovan), a married man known for flirting, catches her eye. Brenda becomes convinced he is attracted to her and that his marriage to Pam Willis (Sue Jones) is failing. Brenda and Doug begin spending together and she tries to seduce him after learning her former husband, Roy (Neil Melville), is remarrying. Brenda becomes emotional and asks Doug to stay with her that night but the plan backfires when Doug sends over Pam to talk to her. Things come to a head when Brenda kisses Doug which is witnessed by his daughter, Gaby Willis (Rachel Blakely). Pam confronts Doug and he is forced to tell Brenda that the flirting was a bit of fun. Brenda is humiliated and avoids her neighbours until Pam tells her that she has nothing against her and explains about Doug's behaviour.

When Brenda discovers Guy is taking steroids to help him in the upcoming Cross-Country race, she tries to make him see sense, but Guy refuses to listen, so Brenda threatens to take steroids herself as long as Guy continues to do so. Guy, fearful, relents and quits taking them. Brenda's problems worsen when it seems that her homemade tuna quiche is the cause of Josh Anderson's (Jeremy Angerson) sickness and she tries to recover any previously sold quiches. Brenda panics when she sees a motionless Bouncer on the floor, but he is only playing dead. Brenda is relieved to find that the quiche is not the cause of Josh's sickness but a virus going around.

Brenda and Dorothy's feud is reignited, after Dorothy tells her off for employing Toby for after school shifts. Brenda schemes by placing a personal advert in the paper's lonely hearts column under Dorothy's name. However, the plan is undone when Lucy Robinson (Melissa Bell) tells Dorothy, who then arranges for a colleague to pose as a suitor. Brenda and Dorothy later become friends after they win a radio quiz. Doug tries to set Brenda up with his workmate Nev Cusack (Jim Ewing) at a dinner party, but he is more interested in Doug's sister Faye Hudson (Lorraine Bayly). Roy arrives much to Brenda's surprise and wants to get back with her after splitting with his wife, Simone (Clarissa House), and plans to set up business in Malaysia and wants Brenda to come with him. Simone encourages Brenda to take a second chance with Roy. Feeling uncertain, Brenda tells Roy to go on without her. After a boring date with Adrian Pitt (Andrew Larkins), Brenda realises Roy is her one true love and leaves Erinsborough.

Guy Carpenter

Guy Carpenter, played by Andrew Williams,  made his first screen appearance on 10 September 1991.  Williams joined the cast of Neighbours as Guy after failing to secure a record contract. He almost rejected the role and explained, "I was still in music mode and I thought Kylie, Jason, Craig... not me, no way". A few months after joining the serial, Williams decided to leave.  On 28 November 2014, it was announced that Williams had reprised his role as Guy for Neighbours 30th anniversary in March 2015.  A writer from the BBC said that Guy's most memorable moment was dating three women at the same time. Lisa Anthony from BIG! branded Guy a "heart throb". Alex Cramb from Inside Soap called the character "Neighbours nice guy". TV Week's Elisabeth di Giovanni observed that Guy was a smooth-talker and "a charming rogue".

Phoebe Bright

Phoebe Gottlieb (née Bright), played by Simone Robertson. She made her first screen appearance as Phoebe during the episode broadcast on 23 September 1991.  Robertson was desperate to secure the role of Phoebe when she learned of the casting. She knew that the character was going to be a "bit freaky" and decided play herself up to the persona. She attended the audition wearing thick glasses and her hair in pigtails. Two days later Robertson was informed that she had won the part. In August 1993, columnists from Shout and Inside Soap reported that both Robertson and her co-star Lochie Daddo were leaving their roles. A writer for the BBC described Phoebe's most notable moment as "Being held hostage at number 30 by Bob Landers."

Andrew Robinson

Andrew Robinson, played by Shannon Holmes, made his first appearance on 13 November 1991. Andrew was born to Paul Robinson (Stefan Dennis) and Christina Alessi (Gayle Blakeney). He departed with his parents in 1992. A writer for BBC Online commented that Andrew was "a delightful little baby" who had endured an unsettled beginning to life. In December 2009, the character was reintroduced to the show after a seventeen-year absence. Actor Jordan Smith was cast in the role. Andrew returns to Erinsborough to reconnect with his father. His backstory was changed to accommodate Smith's Scottish accent. Originally Andrew and Christina moved from Brazil back to Australia, but this was amended to include an intervening stay in Scotland. Smith described his character as "very calculating" and "extremely selfish". He added, "There are definitely characteristics of his father."

Faye Hudson

Faye Hudson, played by Lorraine Bayly, made her first appearance on 28 November 1991. Faye is introduced as Doug Willis's (Terence Donovan) "outrageous" sister. Bayly quit Neighbours to begin rehearsing for a stage show. Shelley Dempsey of The Sun-Herald branded Faye a "busybody". The BBC said Faye's most notable moment was "Being jilted at the altar by Nev Cusack." Faye was nominated for Soap's Biggest Bitch at the 1993 Inside Soap TV Awards.

Faye arrives in Erinsborough and begins staying at Number 28 much to the consternation of her brother, Doug Willis, and his family. During the first day of her arrival, she scolds Toby Mangel (Ben Guerens) for playing with snails, which Doug has asked him to collect and criticises Pam Willis's (Sue Jones) cooking. Faye's presence serves to irritate the family when she meddles in their affairs and generally takes over the house. The family try various schemes to get rid of her but they backfire. Faye leaves for a short holiday with Nev Cusack (Jim Ewing), a friend of Doug's and when she returns Faye reveals that she and Nev are engaged. On the day of the wedding, Doug is forced to break the news that Nev has jilted her. After her initial unhappiness, Faye pursues Jim Robinson (Alan Dale) much to his displeasure. Jim enlists Dorothy Burke's (Maggie Dence) help to stage a cover that they are a couple to ward off Faye's attention.

Faye's stay with the Willises comes to an end when she oversteps the mark by inviting Doug's childhood sweetheart, Alexandra Lomax (Chantal Contouri) to dinner and telling Pam that Doug only married her on the rebound. Doug tells her to leave and she does, only to move two doors down to Number 32 which she rents from Helen Daniels (Anne Haddy). Cameron Hudson (Benjamin Grant Mitchell), Faye's estranged son arrives to defend Pam on a murder charge and later moves in with her after they repair their relationship. Gaby Willis (Rachel Blakely), Faye's niece opens her own fashion boutique Gabrielle's at the Lassiter's complex and Faye cannot help but interfere. One night, Faye fails to turn off a heater, which results in the shop burning down. For a while she remains silent but confesses to a furious Gaby. The insurance company sues Faye and she flees Erinsborough at night. Faye later communicates with the family via postcards and is last known to be living in Paris.

Others

References

External links
 Characters and cast at the Official Neighbours website
 Characters and cast at the Internet Movie Database

1991
, Neighbours
1991 in Australian television